Pandit Bhimsen Joshi Lifetime Achievement Award by the Government of Maharashtra since 2012. Award is given to artist who has been doing outstanding work in the field of classical singing and playing for a long time.

Recipients
The recipients of the Pandit Bhimsen Joshi Lifetime Achievement Award are as follows

References

Civil awards and decorations of Maharashtra